Güzdək (also, Gyuzdek) is a village and municipality in the Absheron Rayon of Azerbaijan. It has a population of 2,145.

References 

Populated places in Absheron District